The German Heritage Museum is located in Cincinnati, Ohio, United States.

This museum serves as the focal point in presenting the contributions of the many German immigrants and their descendants, in the Ohio River Valley and America. The museum focuses especially on representing the long history of German-Americans in the Greater Cincinnati area, which became, and remains one of the major German-American centers in the United States. In addition, the museum displays and showcases the activities of the twenty organizations currently under the umbrella of the German-American Citizens League of Greater Cincinnati, founded in Cincinnati in 1895.

The building that is now the museum had an earlier life as a log house, built around 1840 in nearby Delhi Township. The entire house was moved, piece by piece, to West Fork Park in Green Township and has been reconstructed as the German Heritage Museum.

References

Houses in Cincinnati
German-American museums
German-American culture in Cincinnati
Museums in Cincinnati
Ethnic museums in Ohio